The Arman is a river in Magadan Oblast, Russian Far East.

The name of the Arman originated in the Even language, meaning "spring" or "mashed ice". In the upper course there are stretches where the river is known as Artelnyi (Agchakh) and Akhchan.

Course 
It flows roughly southwards across a mountainous area. In its last stretch is descends to a floodplain with wetlands to the west of Magadan, where it flows across the Arman Range. Further downstream it is joined by the Khasyn from the left. The river ends in a wide lagoon separated from the sea by a landspit. The waters of the Arman enter Taui Bay of the Sea of Okhotsk through a narrow channel at the western end of the spit. Arman village is located on the western side of the mouth of the river. 

Other tributaries are relatively small. The river is frozen between October and May.

Fauna
The river is a spawning ground for salmon. Other main fish species in the Arman are coho salmon, grayling, Dolly Varden char and kundzha.

See also
List of rivers of Russia

References

External links

Kolyma - Modern Guidebook to Magadan Oblast

Rivers of Magadan Oblast
Drainage basins of the Sea of Okhotsk